Pygmephorus lutterloughae is a species of large mites, in the genus Pygmephorus. It was described from a sample in the National Museum of Natural History collection (No. 3782), collected in Oregon in 1970 and is named after Sophie Lutterlough.

References 

Trombidiformes
Animals described in 1979